Sophia Violet "Sophie" Crumb (born September 27, 1981) is an American-French comics artist. She is the daughter of underground comix artists Robert Crumb and Aline Kominsky-Crumb. She had an older half-brother, Jesse, who died in 2017 by injuries he sustained in a car accident.

Crumb was born in Woodland, California, and lived in the nearby farming town of Winters with her parents until she was nine years old. In 1991, she relocated with her family to Sauve, a village in the south of France. Her parents reported that they wanted to remove her from the political conservatives and Christian fundamentalists of the United States. In a 2010 interview, Sophie told The Philadelphia Inquirer that her mother was afraid Sophie would "turn into a Valley girl".

After this relocation, Terry Zwigoff released Crumb (1994), a documentary film about her father and their family. Zwigoff later commissioned Sophie to prepare some original drawings for inclusion in his 2001 comedy drama Ghost World, an adaptation of Daniel Clowes' comics serial of the same name.

After completing her secondary education in France, Crumb studied acrobatics and clowning at a French circus school. While living in Brooklyn in the mid-2000s, she sold her comics on the street and apprenticed herself to a tattoo artist. At another stage, she earned a living by teaching English as a foreign language.

She lives in the south of France with her husband (a construction worker) and their son, Eli, who was born in 2009.

Published work
When Crumb was a child, her parents published some of her drawings in their comics anthology, Weirdo; she later contributed to their comic book series Dirty Laundry Comics, originally published from 1977 to 1992. Her artwork as a six-year-old was also featured in Wimmen's Comix #11 (Apr. 1987).

Crumb illustrated a sketchbook for the American film Ghost World (2001). Her drawings were meant to reflect the personality and inner life of Enid Coleslaw (Thora Birch), the film's protagonist.

In 2002, Fantagraphics Books and Oog & Blik published Crumb's first comic book, Belly Button, followed by Belly Button Comix #2 in 2004. She contributed multiple pieces to installments of Mome published between 2005 and 2008.

Her development as a graphic artist are documented in Sophie Crumb: Evolution of a Crazy Artist (W.W. Norton, 2010). Her debut solo show, which featured more than 20 drawings and giclée prints, coincided with the book's publication. The show ran from November 4 to December 30, 2010, at DCKT Contemporary, Dennis Christie and Ken Tyburski's contemporary art gallery in New York City.

See also
 List of artists who created paintings and drawings for use in films
 List of female comics creators

References

External links
 
 
 Sophie Crumb art gallery at The Official Crumb Site
 

1981 births
American people of English descent
American people of Jewish descent
American people of Scottish descent
Living people
Alternative cartoonists
American expatriates in France
Artists from California
Entertainers from California
American female comics artists
Female comics writers
People from Woodland, California